The 1935 season was the sixth completed season of Finnish Football League Championship, known as the Mestaruussarja.

Overview

The 1935 Mestaruussarja  was contested by 8 teams, with HPS Helsinki winning the championship which was also known as the A-sarja. VIFK Vaasa and ÅIFK Turku were relegated to the second tier which became known in 1936 as Suomensarja.

League table

Results

References

Mestaruussarja seasons
Fin
Fin
1935 in Finnish football